World Skate Asia formerly known as Confederation of Asia Roller Sports (CARS) is the main roller skating organization of Asia. World Skate Asia is part of the World Skate. Varieties of skating governed by the WS include:

Inline Downhill
Roller hockey
Inline hockey
Inline speed skating

One of the most important events organized by CARS is the Roller Hockey Asia Cup.

Asian Roller Sports Championship

Asian Roller Sports Championship is one of the biggest event in Asian Region For Roller Sport, it started in 1985, it is held every 2 years. The Confederation of Asia Roller Sports (CARS) is the main roller skating organization of Asia.  The CARS is part of the International Roller Sports Federation, or FIRS.  Varieties of skating governed by the CARS include:

Speed Skating
Freestyle Skating
Artistic Roller Skating
Roller Hockey
Inline hockey

One of the most important events organized by CARS is the Roller Hockey Asia Cup and Inline Hockey Asia Cup.

Championships

See also
Asian Roller Sports Championships
Fédération Internationale de Roller Sports
World Skate
Roller sport
Inline skating
World Roller Speed Skating Championships

External links
Confederation of Asia Roller Sports(CARS)
Describes organization: FIRS Organizational chart
Confederation of Asia Roller Sports(CARS)
About Roller Sports India
Home of Artistic Inline Figure Skates

Roller Sports
Sports governing bodies in Asia
Roller skating organizations
Roller hockey in Asia